Baroness Bryan may refer to:

 Margaret Bryan, Baroness Bryan
 Pauline Bryan, Baroness Bryan of Partick